North Macedonia's national under-17 football team is the national under-17 football team of the Republic of North Macedonia and is controlled by the Football Federation of North Macedonia. The current manager is Dragi Kanatlarovski. For only players born 1 January 2004 or later are permitted to partake.

Competitive record
*Denotes draws include knockout matches decided on penalty kicks.
Red border color indicates tournament was held on home soil.

FIFA U-17 World Cup

UEFA Euro U-17 
{| class="wikitable" style="text-align: center;"   
|-
!Year
!Round
!GP
!W
!D*
!L
!GS
!GA
|-
| 2002||did not qualify||||||||||||
|-
| 2003||did not qualify|||||||||||| 
|-
| 2004||did not qualify|||||||||||| 
|- 
| 2005||did not qualify||||||||||||   
|-
| 2006||did not qualify|||||||||||| 
|- 
| 2007||did not qualify||||||||||||
|-
| 2008||did not qualify||||||||||||  
|-  
| 2009||did not qualify||||||||||||
|-   
| 2010||did not qualify||||||||||||
|-   
| 2011||did not qualify||||||||||||
|-
| 2012||did not qualify||||||||||||
|-
| 2013||did not qualify||||||||||||
|-   
| 2014||did not qualify||||||||||||
|-
| 2015||did not qualify||||||||||||
|-
| 2016||did not qualify||||||||||||
|-   
| 2017||did not qualify||||||||||||
|-
| 2018||did not qualify||||||||||||
|-
| 2019||did not qualify||||||||||||
|-
| 2020||rowspan=2 colspan=8|Cancelled due to COVID-19 pandemic|-
| 2021
|-
| 2022||did not qualify||||||||||||
|- 
| 2023||rowspan=2 colspan=8|to be determined''
|- 
| 2024
|- 
|Total||0/21||0||0||0||0||0||0    
|}

2022 UEFA European Under-17 Championship qualification

Group 5

Current squad
 The following players were called up for the 2023 UEFA European Under-17 Championship qualification matches.
 Match dates: 25-31 October 2022
 Opposition: ,  and Caps and goals correct as of:''' 14 September 2022, after the match against

References

See also 
 European Under-17 Football Championship
 Macedonia national football team
 Macedonia national under-21 football team
 Macedonia national under-19 football team

Under-21
European national under-17 association football teams
Football in North Macedonia
Youth football in North Macedonia